The XIII Bolivarian Games (Spanish: Juegos Bolivarianos) were a multi-sport event held between October 17–26, 1997, in Arequipa, Peru. The Games were organized by the Bolivarian Sports Organization (ODEBO).

The opening ceremony that took place on October 17, 1997, at the Estadio Monumental de la Universidad Nacional San Agustín in Arequipa, Perú.  The Games were officially opened by Peruvian president Alberto Fujimori. Torch lighter was 70-year-old former cyclist Hernán Llerena, who won 4 gold medals at the 1947–48 Bolivarian Games and another gold medal at the 1951 Bolivarian Games.

Gold medal winners from Ecuador were published by the Comité Olímpico Ecuatoriano.

Participation 
About 1710 athletes from 6 countries were reported to participate:

 (324)
 (304)
 (285)
 (103)
 (488)
 (491)

The numbers might include coaches, because other sources publish smaller
numbers.

Sports 
The following 20 sports (+ 1 exhibition) were explicitly mentioned:

Aquatic sports 
 Swimming
 Athletics
 Basketball
 Bowling
 Boxing
 Climbing†
Cycling 
 Road cycling
 Track cycling
 Equestrian
 Fencing
 Football‡
Gymnastics 
 Artistic gymnastics
 Judo
 Karate
 Shooting
 Softball
 Table tennis
 Taekwondo
 Tennis
 Volleyball
 Weightlifting
 Wrestling

†: Exhibition event.
‡: The competition was reserved to youth representatives (U-17).

Medal count
The medal count for these Games is tabulated below.  This table is sorted by the number of gold medals earned by each country.  The number of silver medals is taken into consideration next, and then the number of bronze medals.

References 

 
Bolivarian Games
B
Bolivarian Games
Bolivarian Games
B
Multi-sport events in Peru
Arequipa
October 1997 sports events in South America